Key West is both a subdivision in Albemarle County, Virginia and a historic home that formerly served as a place name for the community. The Key West estate was owned by the Minors, a prominent and wealthy family, before much of the land was sold off to become the Key West subdivision. The house still stands.

The land is the west side of the property granted to Martin Key in 1731 by George II.

References

Unincorporated communities in Virginia
Unincorporated communities in Albemarle County, Virginia